Walt is a masculine given name and a surname. 

Walt may also refer to:

 The Walt, a Dutch post-punk/indie rock band
 Walt (album), a 2013 studio album by the Croatian alternative rock band Pips, Chips & Videoclips
 Walt: The Man Behind the Myth, a biographical documentary about Walt Disney
 WALT (disambiguation), various American radio stations
 Walt (military slang), a British military term for an impostor